Grove Lake is an unincorporated community in Pope County, Minnesota, United States.

Notes

Unincorporated communities in Pope County, Minnesota
Unincorporated communities in Minnesota